Božo Kovačević may refer to:

 Božo Kovačević (footballer) (born 1979), footballer in Austria
 Božo Kovačević (politician) (born 1955), Croatian politician and diplomat